Prince Boris Grigoryevich Yusupov (Russian : Борис Григорьевич Юсупов; 1695–1759) was a Russian nobleman and politician.

Life
From the house of Yusupov, a Russian noble family descended from 10th-century khans, he was elected a senator and became governor general of Moscow and St Petersburg. His parents were Grigory Dmitriyevich Yusupov (1676–1730), friend and minister of war to Peter I of Russia, and his wife Anna Nikitchna Akinfova, daughter of an okolnichy (noble rank below that of boyar). He was the great-great-grandfather of prince Felix Yusupov.

At age 20, Boris was sent to study in the French navy. He became a chamberlain in 1730, governor general of Moscow in 1738 and a senator from 18 June 1695 to 3 March 1759. Under Elizabeth I of Russia he was put in control of the Russian imperial schools and in 1749 was made governor of St Petersburg.

Marriage and issue
He married Irina Mikhaïlovna Zinovieva (1718-1788), daughter of Mikhaïl Petrovitch Zinoviev, with whom he had five children:
 Evdokia (1743–1780), married 1774 Peter von Biron (1724-1800), duke of Courland ; separated in 1776, divorced in 1778 
 Alexandra  (1744–1791), married Ivan Mikhaïlovitch Izmaïlov (1724–1787)
 Elisaveta (1745–1770), in 1764 married prince Andreï Mikhaïlovitch Golitsyn (1729–1770)
 Anna  (1749–1772), in 1771 married Alexandre Iakovlevitch Protasov (1742–1799)
 Nikolaï (1751–1831), in 1793 married Tatiana Vassilievna von Engelhart (1769–1841), one of the nieces of prince Grigori Potemkin.

External links
http://www.alexanderpalace.org/LostSplendor/intro.html 

1695 births
1759 deaths
Boris
Burials at Lazarevskoe Cemetery (Saint Petersburg)
Governors-General of Moscow
Russian princes